Zlatia is a village in Valchedram Municipality, Montana Province, northwestern Bulgaria.

Honours
Zlatiya Glacier on Brabant Island, Antarctica is named after the village.

References

Villages in Montana Province